Carl Richard Unger (2 July 1817 – 30 November 1897) was a Norwegian historian and philologist. Unger was professor of Germanic and Romance philology at the University of Christiania from 1862 and was a prolific editor of Old Norse texts.

Early life 
Unger was born in Christiania, now Oslo, to Johan Carl Jonassen Unger and Annemarie Wetlesen. Between 1830 and 1832 he lived in Telemark with the poet and priest Simon Olaus Wolff. He graduated from school in 1835.

Academic career 
Unger studied philology after school but did not receive a degree as mathematics, a subject with which he struggled, was compulsory for philologists. However, in 1841 he was awarded a scholarship to continue studying Old Norse, Old English and Old German.

In 1845 Unger began lecturing on Old Norse at the University of Christiana. He was appointed lecturer of Germanic and Romance philology in 1851 and became professor in 1862.

Edited works

See also
 Peter Andreas Munch
 Sophus Bugge
 Magnus Olsen

References 

1817 births
1897 deaths
Norwegian philologists
Germanic studies scholars
Old Norse studies scholars
Academic staff of the University of Oslo
19th-century philologists
19th-century Norwegian historians
19th-century Norwegian male writers
Members of the Royal Society of Sciences in Uppsala